Professor Richard Leplastrier AO (born 1939, Melbourne, Australia) is an Australian architect and AIA Gold Medal recipient, he was a Professor of Practice (Architecture) at the University of Newcastle, Australia.

After graduation from Sydney University in 1963, he worked in the Sydney office of Jørn Utzon from 1964 to 1966 assisting with documentation of the Sydney Opera House. He later studied at Kyoto University under Tomoya Masuda and worked in the office of Kenzo Tange in Tokyo.

Leplastrier established his own practice in 1970 and works from his studio in Sydney's Lovett Bay. He teaches master classes for beginning and established architects with his colleagues Glenn Murcutt and Peter Stutchbury.

He has contributed several unique and thoughtful ideas during preservation and development discussions around the Pittwater area.  During the 1980s he raised the idea of resurrecting the creekline natural corridor which leads from Avalon Beach through Elba Lane up through Toongari and Nandina reserves and down past Avalon sailing club, linking the sea to the bay.  He has strong opinions regarding the re-development and re-commercialization of the Pasadena wharf the point of embarkation for commuters to Western Pittwater, submitting the 'lePlastrier plan' to the debate.

Selected works
 1974–76: Palm Garden House, Northern Beaches, Sydney
 1981–84 1989-90: Bellingen House and Studio, New South Wales
 1988–91: Rainforest House, Mapleton, Queensland
 1988–92: Tom Uren House, Balmain, Sydney
 1994: Lovett Bay House, Sydney
 1996: Cloudy Bay Retreat, Bruny Island, Tasmania
 1997: Watson's Bay House, Sydney
 1997-8, 2000: Blue Mountains House and Studio, Leura, New South Wales
 2002 Design Centre Tasmania, Launceston (with David Travalia)

Awards
In 1996 he received the New South Wales Royal Australian Institute of Architects 'Special Jury Award'. He was awarded the Royal Australian Institute of Architects Gold Medal in 1999 and in 2004 was awarded the Spirit Of Nature Wood Architecture Award, presented in Finland. In 2009, he was awarded the Dreyer Foundation Prize of Honour 2009 for his commitment to sustainability. In 2011 he was made an Officer of the Order of Australia for distinguished service to architecture, particularly through the application of environmentally sensitive design, and as an educator and mentor..

References

Sources

External links
 Spirit of Nature Wood Architecture website
 Architecture Foundation Australia

1939 births
Living people
Recipients of the Royal Australian Institute of Architects’ Gold Medal